The 1st Bari Grand Prix was a Formula One motor race held on 13 July 1947 at the Lungomare Circuit, in Bari, Italy. The 50-lap race was won by Achille Varzi in an Alfa Romeo 158, who also started from pole and set fastest lap. Varzi's team mate Consalvo Sanesi finished second, and Renato Balestrero and Enrico Ziegler shared third in an Alfa Romeo 8C.

Results

References

Bari Grand Prix
Bari
Bari